Ihor Volodymyrovych Vasyliv (born 16 November 1979) is a Ukrainian politician currently serving as a People's Deputy of Ukraine from Ukraine's 164th electoral district.

Early life and career 
Ihor Volodymyrovych Vasyliv was born on 16 November 1979, in the city of Ternopil within what was then the Soviet Union. In 1997, he graduated from Ternopil Secondary School No. 20, before graduating from Ternopil Technical University in 2002, specialising in electrical engineering. Prior to his election as a People's Deputy, he was an entrepreneur.

Political career 
Vasyliv was a participant in both the 2004 Orange Revolution and the 2014 Revolution of Dignity. In 2014, he was elected as head of the Ternopil Oblast chapter of Automaidan, and organised financial support for Ukrainian volunteers fighting in the War in Donbas.

Vasyliv was elected as a People's Deputy of Ukraine in 2019, representing Ukraine's 164th electoral district. At the time of his election, he was an independent. Following his election, he became a member of the Verkhovna Rada Committee on Infrastructure and Transportation.

According to the news website Slovo i Dilo, Vasyliv, has fulfilled more electoral promises than any other People's Deputy in Ternopil Oblast, with 24% of his promises fulfilled. Among his fulfilled electoral promises were to seize the property of corrupt individuals, an independent audit of the nation's roads, and simplifying the process of impeaching the President.

References 

1979 births
Living people
Ninth convocation members of the Verkhovna Rada
Politicians from Ternopil